Urangattiri  is a village in Malappuram district in the state of Kerala, India. It is situated in the valley of Chaliyar. There are 21 wards in this village.

Location
Urangattiri is located on the north and east side of Areekode town in Malappuram District, Kerala, India.

Transportation
Urangattiri village connects to other parts of India through Feroke town on the west and Nilambur town on the east.  National highway No.66 passes through Pulikkal and the northern stretch connects to Goa and Mumbai.  The southern stretch connects to Cochin and Trivandrum.  State Highway No.28 starts from Nilambur and connects to Ooty, Mysore and Bangalore through Highways.12,29 and 181. The nearest airport is at Kozhikode.  The nearest major railway station is at Feroke.

Demographics
census, Urangattiri had a population of 26546 with 13138 males and 13408 females.

References

   Villages in Malappuram district
Kondotty area